Venancio Saturno (born April 1, 1954), better known as Vehnee Saturno, is a Filipino composer, songwriter and record producer. He found success in 1982 by winning at the Metro Manila Popular Music Festival first place for the song "Isang Dakot".

Early life
Saturno was born in Iloilo City on April 1, 1954, to a carpenter and a housewife who struggled together with his nine siblings with poverty which inspired him to write songs.

His dream was to be a journalist, but due to his family's financial situation he was not able to finish his studies. He trained at the Philippine Air Force after high school and eventually went to odd jobs including as a photocopy machine operator.

Music career
In 1982, his composition Isang Dakot was interpreted by Sonia Singson won the Grand Prize at the Metropop. In 1983, Be My Lady was interpreted by Pedrito Montaire was a finalist at the Metropop, this song was his first major big hit which was interpreted by Martin Nievera and was released under Vicor Music.

His songs are "Be My Lady", "Sana Kahit Minsan", "Mula sa Puso" and "'Till My Heartaches End" becomes timeless hits in the Philippines.
In the late 1990s he has also produced Monster hits for female artists Jessa Zaragoza for her Just Can’t Help Feelin album and Jaya for her hit songs for her 1996 In The Raw Album that lasted for three years on the radio for her exclusive hits Laging Naroon Ka and Wala Na Bang Pag Ibig and Dahil Ba Sa Kanya? Which all became the theme song of all films with the carrier titles. In 2001 Kulang Pa Ba? For Rachel Alejandro 

Saturno also owns his own music label, Vehnee Saturno Music Corp. He often composes music and manage artists through this label.

Awards and nominations

References

External links

1954 births
Living people
Filipino songwriters
People from Cabuyao
Filipino record producers